The A Cumberland District is a high school conference of the Virginia High School League which draws its members from the western part of Southwest Virginia. The schools in the Cumberland District compete in A Region D with the schools of the A Black Diamond District and the A Lonesome Pine District.

In the 2013 VHSL realignment, the members of the Cumberland District also comprise Conference 48 for the first round of post-season competition.  The Cumberland District is one of only two districts whose members also solely comprise a conference.

Member schools
Castlewood High School of Castlewood, Virginia
Eastside High School of Coeburn, Virginia
Rye Cove High School of Duffield, Virginia
Thomas Walker High School of Ewing, Virginia
Twin Springs High School of Nickelsville, Virginia
 John I. Burton High School of Norton, Virginia

Former Member Schools -- Closed
Jonesville High School of Jonesville, Virginia
Pennington High School of Pennington Gap, Virginia
Flatwoods High School of Jonesville, Virginia
Dryden High School of Dryden, Virginia
Keokee High School of Keokee, Virginia
Saint Paul High School (Virginia) of Saint Paul, Virginia
Coeburn High School of Coeburn, Virginia
Ervinton High School of Nora, Virginia
Clintwood High School of Clintwood, Virginia

 Virginia High School League